Edward Hamley may refer to:
 Edward Hamley (poet) (1764–1834), British clergyman and poet
 Sir Edward Bruce Hamley (1824–1893), British general, military writer and politician